was a Japanese geneticist known for his work on the genetics of wheat.

Biography
Hitoshi Kihara was born on 21 October 1893 in Tokyo, Japan. He graduated from the Faculty of Agriculture, Hokkaido Imperial University and served as a professor at the Faculty of Agriculture, Kyoto University from 1927 to 1956 and the National Institute of Genetics from 1955 to 1969, and also served at Kihara Institute for Biological Research from 1942 to 1984. He was elected a member of the Japan Academy, the United States National Academy of Sciences, the American Academy of Arts and Sciences, and the American Philosophical Society.

Since 1983, the Genetics Society of Japan (GSJ) has awarded the Kihara Prize to researchers who made a considerable achievement in the field of genetics in honor of Hitoshi Kihara who contributed on a global scale to the field of genetics and study of evolution with his research centering on wheat.

In 1985, the Kihara Memorial Yokohama Foundation for the Advancement of Life Sciences was established in Yokohama, to commemorate Hitoshi Kihara and to promote life sciences.

Contribution
At that time, it was mandatory for a Japanese academic to work overseas for a number of years in order to gain admission as members of research faculties. While working in Germany, Hitoshi Kihara studied the genetics of Rumex acetosella and other Sorrel species, and discovered the sex chromosomes. In 1936, he noticed that in wheat seven chromosomes become a pair that performs the lowest gene function, and thus named it genome. The concept of genome extended all over the world and formed the basis for development of biology and genetic engineering.

See also
 Kihara Memorial Foundation Academic Award

References

External links
 Kihara Memorial Yokohama Foundation for the Advancement of Life Sciences
 Kihara Institute for Biological Research, Yokohama City University

1893 births
1986 deaths
20th-century Japanese botanists
Japanese geneticists
Scientists from Tokyo
Academic staff of Kyoto University
Hokkaido University alumni
Foreign associates of the National Academy of Sciences
Members of the American Philosophical Society